The 2010 Maldives FA Cup, also referred to as the Coca-Cola FA Cup due to sponsorship, was the 23rd edition of the Maldives FA Cup.

A total of 25 teams competed in this edition of the FA Cup.

The cup winners were guaranteed a place in the 2011 AFC Cup.

Quarterfinals

|-
|colspan="3" style="background-color:#99CCCC"|28 September 2010

|-
|colspan="3" style="background-color:#99CCCC"|29 September 2010

|-
|colspan="3" style="background-color:#99CCCC"|30 September 2010

|-
|colspan="3" style="background-color:#99CCCC"|1 October 2010

|}

Semifinals

|-
|colspan="3" style="background-color:#99CCCC"|4 October 2010

|-
|colspan="3" style="background-color:#99CCCC"|5 October 2010

|}

Third place match

|-
|colspan="3" style="background-color:#99CCCC"|17 October 2010

|}

Final

References
RSSSF.com

Maldives FA Cup seasons
FA Cup